Football Club Ferizaj, commonly known as Ferizaj, is a professional football club based in Ferizaj, Kosovo. The club plays in the Football Superleague of Kosovo, which is the first tier of football in the country.

History

Privatization
The club was formed in 1923 as Borci (meaning "fighters" in Serbian) and it is one of the oldest in Kosovo still active.

On July 7, 2019, Ferizaj organized a media conference announcing that English and local investors became the club's new leadership. Among the investors is also the former English international striker, Brian Deane, who owns 50% of the club's shares.

Players

Current squad

Other players under contract

Out on loan

Historical list of coaches

 Skënder Shengyli
 Bylbyl Sokoli (Jan 2013 - Jun 2014)
 Arsim Abazi (Mar 2014 - May 2014)
 Rexhep Murseli ( - Jun 2015)
 Agron Selmani (29 Jul 2015 - Sep 2016)
 Arsim Abazi (14 Sep 2016 - 5 Jan 2017)
 Argjend Beqiri (7 Jan 2017 - 20 Apr 2017)
 Rexhep Murseli (24 Jun 2017 -)
 Bylbyl Sokoli (Jan 2018 - May 2018)
 Afrim Tovërlani (26 Jul 2018 - Jan 2019) 
 Bylbyl Sokoli (23 Jan 2019 - Jun 2019)
 Bekim Isufi (Aug 2019 - Feb 2020)
 Arbnor Morina (17 Sep 2021 - 9 Oct 2022)
 Andrej Panadić (12 Oct 2022  -

Honours

References

 
Association football clubs established in 1923
Football clubs in Kosovo
Football clubs in Yugoslavia
1923 establishments in Yugoslavia